Seiko is a Japanese given name, almost exclusively feminine. Its meaning depends on the kanji used to write it.

Kanji and meaning
The "ko" in Seiko is generally written with a kanji meaning "child", and in that case is exclusively feminine; the kanji for "Sei" varies, for example:
 ("clear weather"); also read Haruko
 ("upright", "correct"); also read Masako or Shōko, and also used in Korean to write the name Jeong-ja
 ("clean", "pure"); also read Kiyoko or Sayako
 ("holy"); also read Kiyoko or Shōko, and also used in Korean to write the name Seong-ja
 ("blue" or "green"); also read Aoko 

Rarely, the "ko" may be written with a kanji meaning "lake". Written this way, the name may be either masculine or feminine.

People
People with this name include:
 , Japanese male martial artist
 , Japanese politician, House of Councillors member, former ice speed skater and track cycling sprinter
 , Japanese painter and poet
 , Japanese volleyball player
 Seiko Lee Japanese soprano
 , Japanese singer
 , Japanese artist
 , Japanese voice actress
 , Japanese actress
 , Japanese politician, House of Representatives member
 , Japanese shot putter
 , Japanese tennis player
 , Japanese female painter
 , Japanese singer-songwriter
 , Japanese volleyball player who competed at the 1972 Summer Olympics
 , Japanese novelist
 , Japanese badminton player
 , Japanese wrestler
 , Japanese voice actress

Fictional characters with this name include:
 Seiko Shinohara, in the survival horror video game Corpse Party
 Seiko Kimura, a character from Danganronpa 3: The End of Hope's Peak High School

See also
People with the Japanese masculine name Seikō (with a long vowel in "kō")
, scholar-bureaucrat of the Ryūkyū Kingdom
, Japanese football defender

References

Japanese feminine given names